Czechoslovakia competed at the 1980 Winter Olympics in Lake Placid, United States.

Medalists

Alpine skiing

Men

Women

Biathlon

Men

Men's 4 x 7.5 km relay

 1 A penalty loop of 150 metres had to be skied per missed target.
 2 One minute added per close miss (a hit in the outer ring), two minutes added per complete miss.

Cross-country skiing

Men

Men's 4 × 10 km relay

Women

Women's 4 × 5 km relay

Figure skating

Ice Dancing

Ice hockey

First round - Blue Division

Consolation round
The third-placed teams in each division, Czechoslovakia and Canada, played each other to determine fifth place.

Final Rank: 5th place

Leading scorers

Team Roster:
Jiří Králík
Karel Lang
Jan Neliba
Vítězslav Ďuriš
Milan Chalupa
Arnold Kadlec
Miroslav Dvořák
František Kaberle
Jiří Bubla
Milan Nový
Jiři Novák
Miroslav Fryčer
Marián Šťastný
Anton Šťastný
Vincent Lukáč
Karel Holý
Jaroslav Pouzar
Bohuslav Ebermann
Vladimír Martinec
Peter Šťastný

Luge

Men

(Men's) doubles

Women

Ski jumping

References

Official Olympic Reports
International Olympic Committee results database
 Olympic Winter Games 1980, full results by sports-reference.com

Nations at the 1980 Winter Olympics
1980
Winter Olympics